The 2012–13 CWHL season (Canadian Women's Hockey League) was the league's sixth. The Boston Blades defeated the defending champions Montreal Stars at the finals in Markham, Ontario.

Teams and statistics
Final standings:

Team Alberta was captained by Bobbi-Jo Slusar with alternates Meaghan Mikkelson, Jenna Cunningham and Erin Duggan. Boston was captained by Caitlin Cahow. Brampton was captained by Jayna Hefford with alternates Gillian Apps and Lori Dupuis. Montreal was captained by Lisa-Marie Breton, with alternates Caroline Ouellette, Noémie Marin and Catherine Ward. Toronto was captained by Tessa Bonhomme with alternates Mallory Deluce, Shannon Moulson and Britni Smith.

Awards and honours 
The 2013 CWHL Awards Gala was held on Mar. 21, 2013 in Markham, ON (during the Clarkson Cup weekend). That night, the league formally recognized the CWHL regular-season champions, the Angela James Bowl winner, the Most Valuable Player, the Goaltender of the Year, the Rookie of the Year, the Coach of the Year, the Defenceman of the Year, and the Humanitarian Award winner. The all-star teams (as voted by the five head coaches) and annual all-rookie team were announced before the start of the 2013–14 season.

 Most Valuable Player: Hilary Knight, Boston
 Angela James Bowl: Top Scorer Meghan Agosta, Montreal
 Outstanding Rookie: Ann-Sophie Bettez, Montreal
 Coach of the Year: Digit Murphy, Boston
 Humanitarian Award: Samantha Holmes-Domagala

CWHL Top Players
 Top Forward: Hilary Knight, Boston
 Top Defender: Catherine Ward, Montreal
 Top Goaltender: Genevieve Lacasse, Boston

CWHL All-Stars
First Team All-Stars
 Goaltender: Genevieve Lacasse, Boston
 Defender: Gigi Marvin, Boston
 Defender: Catherine Ward, Montreal
 Forward: Hilary Knight, Boston
 Forward: Meghan Agosta, Montréal
 Forward: Caroline Ouellette, Montreal
Second Team All-Stars
 Goaltender: Charline Labonte, Montreal
 Defender: Kacey Bellamy, Boston
 Defender: Tessa Bonhomme, Toronto
 Forward: Jayna Hefford, Brampton
 Forward: Rebecca Johnston, Toronto
 Forward: Meghan Duggan, Boston

CWHL All-Rookie Team
 Goaltender: Genevieve Lacasse, Boston
 Defender: Tara Watchorn, Alberta
 Defender: Anne Schleper, Boston
 Forward: Hilary Knight, Boston
 Forward: Ann-Sophie Bettez, Montreal
 Forward: Rebecca Johnston, Toronto

CWHL Monthly Top Scorer
 October: Vicki Bendus, Brampton
 November: Meghan Agosta, Montreal
 December: Meghan Agosta, Montreal
 January: Meghan Agosta, Montreal
 February: Jayna Hefford, Brampton
 March: Meghan Agosta, Montreal

Postseason

References

 
Canadian Women's Hockey League seasons